Whiteford–Cardiff Historic District is a national historic district at Cardiff and Whiteford, Harford County, Maryland, United States. It encompasses portions of two communities in northern Harford County that were historically associated with slate production during the late 19th and early 20th centuries.  It contains 140 contributing resources including four vernacular Welsh cottages dating to about 1850. The Whiteford–Cardiff area is noted for its strong Welsh ethnic identity, which is reflected in the architecture of the area.

It was added to the National Register of Historic Places in 2005.

See also
 Cambria, Maryland

References

External links
, including photo dated 2004, at Maryland Historical Trust
Boundary Map of the Whiteford–Cardiff Historic District, Harford County, at Maryland Historical Trust

Welsh-American culture in Maryland
Historic districts in Harford County, Maryland
Historic districts on the National Register of Historic Places in Maryland
Victorian architecture in Maryland
Colonial Revival architecture in Maryland
Welsh-American history
National Register of Historic Places in Harford County, Maryland